The 2000 Basildon District Council election took place on 4 May 2000 to elect members of Basildon District Council in Essex, England. One third of the council was up for election and the Labour party lost overall control of the council to no overall control.

After the election, the composition of the council was
Labour 20
Conservative 18
Liberal Democrats 4

Election result
The results saw the Conservatives make gains from both Labour and Liberal Democrats to go from 11 to 18 seats on the council. This deprived Labour of a majority on the council after 5 years and reduced Labour's lead over the Conservatives to just 2 seats. Meanwhile, the Liberal Democrats lost half their seats to fall to have just 4 councillors, but were left with the balance of power.

The Conservatives gained marginal seats in Basildon from Labour including Laindon, Langdon Hills and Pitsea East. They also took all the seats the Liberal Democrats had been defending in Billericay and Wickford.

Following the election the Liberal Democrat leader Geoff Williams said "issues will be decided on their merit and not on party politics".

All comparisons in vote share are to the corresponding 1996 election.

Ward results

Billericay East

Billericay West

Burstead

Fryerns Central

Fryerns East

Laindon

Langdon Hills

Lee Chapel North

Nethermayne

Pitsea East

Pitsea West

Vange

Wickford North

Wickford South

References

2000
2000 English local elections
2000s in Essex